Zabrega is a village situated in Malo Crniće municipality in Serbia.

References

Populated places in Braničevo District